Marshall Ayres (born June 28, 1807) was one of the founding pioneers of the Midwest, particularly around the Chicago region.

Early years
Ayres was born in Truro, Massachusetts (Cape Cod).  He was the seventh child of nine born to father Dr. Jason Ayres and mother Betsey Holman who were married April 17, 1791.   His father was the fifth generation of settlers to the New World, as a direct descendant of Captain John Ayres and Susanna Symonds of Ipswich, Massachusetts, 1648. His mother was the daughter of Jonathan Holman and Olive Farr of Stow, Massachusetts; Jonathan being a lineal descendant of Jeremiah Holman and Betsey Pratt, daughter of Phineas Pratt and granddaughter of Mayflower passenger Degory Priest.

He married Hannah (Lombard) Ayers, who were native to Truro, Cape Cod, Massachusetts. Ayres, was one of the pioneer residents of Griggsville, IL moving there in 1821.

There son Marshall Ayres, Jr. and future oil industrialist, was born on February 20, 1839

The two families were successful business partners in Illinois with the Ayres & Lombard Bank & Store, and also a steamboat ferry called Prairie State.

References

1807 births
Year of death missing
People from Griggsville, Illinois
People from Truro, Massachusetts